= D'Antignac Swamp =

Swamp in Georgia, United States of America

Coordinates: 33.1919477°N 81.7830701°W

D'Antignac Swamp is a swamp in the U.S. state of Georgia.

D'Antignac Swamp was named after William D'Antignac, the original owner of the site.
